Anastase Alfieri (23 March 1892 Alexandria – 1971 Cairo) was an Italian entomologist who worked principally on Coleoptera but, also,  with Hermann Preisner, on Heteroptera. Most of his work was on the fauna of Egypt. His collection is shared between the natural history museum in Tutzing :de:Tutzing and the National Museum of Natural History in Washington D.C. (Smithsonian).

His principal works are
The Coleoptera of Egypt. Mem. Soc. Entomol. Egypt. 5:38.(1976)
with Hermann Preisner A review of the Hemiptera Heteroptera known to us from Egypt. Bulletin de la Société Fouad Ier d’Entomologie 37:1-119.(1953).

Italian entomologists
Italian expatriates in Egypt
1892 births
1971 deaths
20th-century Italian zoologists